Boo, Bitch is an American comedy miniseries created by Tim Schauer, Kuba Soltysiak, Erin Ehrlich and Lauren Iungerich that premiered on Netflix on July 8, 2022. The series stars Lana Condor, Zoe Colletti, Mason Versaw, Aparna Brielle, and Tenzing Norgay Trainor.

Cast and characters

Main
 Lana Condor as Erika Vu
 Zoe Colletti as Gia, Erika's best friend since childhood 
 Mason Versaw as Jake C., Erika's crush 
 Aparna Brielle as Riley, a popular girl who is Jake C's on-off girlfriend, and a frenemy of Erika. 
 Tenzing Norgay Trainor as Gavin, Gia's love interest, and leader of The Afterlifers

Recurring

 Jami Alix as Lea, Riley’s friend 
 Nick Benson as Chase
 Brittany Bardwell as Sophia 
 John Brantley Cole as Dr. Vu, Erika's father 
 Van Brunelle as Oliver Vu, Erika's younger brother  
 Austin Fryberger as Archer
 Conor Husting as Jake W., Jake C's best friend 
 Alyssa Jirrels as Alyssa, a teen mom 
 Michael Solomon as Jake M., Jake C's best friend 
 Cathy Vu as Mrs. Vu, Erika's mother  
 Savira Windyani as Sail, a member of the Afterlifers 
 Abigail Achiri as Raven, a member of The Afterlifers 
 Reid Miller as Brad, a member of The Afterlifers
 Jason Genao as Devon, a childhood enemy of Erika

Guest starring
 Madison Thompson as Emma, head of the prom committee

Episodes

Production

Development
On February 5, 2021, Netflix gave production a limited series order consisting of eight episodes. The series is created by Tim Schauer, Kuba Soltysiak, Erin Ehrlich, Lauren Iungerich. Ehrlich and Iungerich are also are expected to executive produce alongside Lana Condor, Jonathon Komack Martin, Blake Goza, and Jamie Dooner. The series premiered on July 8, 2022.

Casting
Upon the limited series order announcement, Condor was also cast to star. On August 27, 2021, Zoe Colletti, Mason Versaw, and Aparna Brielle joined the cast as series regulars while Tenzing Norgay Trainor and Jason Genao were cast in recurring capacities. On June 13, 2022, it was reported that Jami Alix, Madison Thompson, and Reid Miller joined the cast in undisclosed capacities.

Reception
The review aggregator website Rotten Tomatoes reported a 56% approval rating with an average rating of 5.6/10, based on 18 critic reviews. Metacritic, which uses a weighted average, assigned a score of 49 out of 100 based on 8 critics, indicating "mixed or average reviews".
The series was praised for the cast's acting skills, however the script was heavily criticized for trying to be too similar to the 2004 film  'Mean Girls'  and the 2019 film 'Booksmart.'

References

External links 
 
 

2020s American comedy television series
2020s American high school television series
2022 American television series debuts
2022 American television series endings
English-language Netflix original programming
Television series about teenagers